Shane Paul Howarth (born 8 July 1968) is a former international rugby union player who gained four caps and scored 54 points for the All Blacks before later switching allegiance to Wales, attaining 19 Welsh caps.

An outside-half or full-back, he was a prolific goal-kicker and a fast elusive runner. He scored 23 points for Wales including a try in the 32–31 victory over England in 1999 played at Wembley as the Millennium Stadium was under construction in Cardiff.

Background
Howarth was born in Auckland, New Zealand. He was educated at St Peter's College, Auckland.

Rugby career
He played for the Auckland Marist club and Auckland. He made his All Black debut against South Africa in 1994 and played in three tests in the series.

In 1996 he switched to rugby league, signing with the North Queensland Cowboys in the Australian Rugby League competition. He played twelve games for the club and scored forty nine points, including three field goals.
 However he was not re-signed by the club and instead returned to rugby union, playing three games for the Auckland Blues during the 1997 Super 12 season.

He moved to England to play for Sale at outside-half. There was then a tug-of-war between various nations for him to play for them, but he chose Wales, after being offered the chance to play for Newport. Howarth moved to Newport RFC in 1999 and played for the club until 2003, scoring 1,035 points and helping the Black & Ambers win the WRU Principality Cup.

Coaching

Howarth commenced a coaching in Auckland. He was assistant coach of the Pacific Islanders, New Zealand in 2004 and 2005. Howarth was assistant coach for the Auckland NPC team from 2006 until 2010 under Pat Lam. Auckland claimed four championships in 10 years. Howarth's tenure was ended after Auckland slumped to seventh in 2010.[2]

In June 2012 he was appointed as backs coach to London Wasps. From September 2013 until late 2014, Howarth was backs coach for the Worcester Warriors.

Grannygate 
In 2000 it was discovered that his grandfather was not born in Wales but New Zealand, and he was ineligible to play for Wales. The scandal that followed was termed "grannygate" and Howarth was banned from representing Wales. He retired at the end of 2003. Howarth could have qualified for Wales through residency before he retired but by then the IRB had changed the rules so that players could only represent one country.

References

External links 

Shane Howarth at the Rugby League Project
Sporting heroes – New Zealand
bio
Sporting Heroes – Wales
Newport RFC profile
Wales profile

1968 births
Living people
Auckland rugby union players
New Zealand expatriate sportspeople in Wales
New Zealand international rugby union players
New Zealand national rugby league team players
New Zealand rugby league players
New Zealand rugby union coaches
New Zealand rugby union players
Newport RFC players
North Queensland Cowboys players
Sale Sharks players
People educated at St Peter's College, Auckland
Rugby league fullbacks
Rugby league players from Auckland
Rugby union controversies
Rugby union fullbacks
Sports scandals in Wales
Wales international rugby union players